The South American Half Marathon Championships (Spanish: Campeonatos Sudamericanos de Media Maratón) is an annual Road running competition organized by CONSUDATLE for athletes representing the countries of its member associations. The event was established in 1995.

Editions

Results 
The winners were published.  The 2008 results were extracted from the 2008 IAAF World Half Marathon Championships. Further results were compiled from various sources.

Men

Women

Medal table

See also 
IAAF World Half Marathon Championships

References 

Half marathon
Half marathons
Half
Recurring sporting events established in 1995
Continental athletics championships